A Fazenda (English: The Farm)  is a Brazilian reality television game show based on the Swedish television series of the same name that was originally created in 2001 by Strix and produced in association with Sony Entertainment and Endemol. The series premiered on Sunday, May 31, 2009 at 9:30 p.m. on RecordTV.

The show is based on a group of celebrities living together twenty-four hours a day in a Farm (located in Itu during first eight seasons, and in Itapecerica da Serra since season nine), isolated from the outside world (primarily from mass media, such as newspapers, telephones, television and the internet) while having all their steps followed by cameras around-the-clock, with no privacy for three months.

The contestants compete for the chance to win the grand prize by avoiding weekly eviction, until the last celebrity remains at the end of the season that can claim the grand prize. The show was originally presented by news reporter Britto Junior, a position he held throughout the first seven seasons. Roberto Justus later replaced Britto as the host of the series from the eighth season onwards.

Since 2010, the subscription-based live feeds are available directly through R7.com. In order to preserve the drama for television broadcasts, RecordTV does not webcast certain moments that transpire in the house, including weekly competitions.

Format
A property with over 150 thousand square meters in Itu, in the countryside of São Paulo, was especially prepared, with camera installations, power towers, microphones and all necessary infrastructure for the production. After eight seasons, the reality show leaves the Toca dos Leões site in Itu and moves to Toca do Tuim, located in Itapecerica da Serra.

Each season, the 14-22 celebrities, such as actors, singers, models, digital influencers or media personalities, known as Farmers, need to prove abilities to work in the country: wake up very early, take care of the cows, wash the horses, collect eggs from chickens, harvest greens, and more. The show airs daily and each season lasts about three months.

Season chronology

Fazenda de Verão

Fazenda de Verão (English: Summer Farm) was spin-off of A Fazenda, but with anonymous people, instead of the celebrities playing the role of farmers. Rodrigo Faro was the host, replacing Britto Junior from the main celebrity version.

Records

Highest number of rejections

Ratings and reception

References

External links
 Official Site 

 
The Farm (franchise)
2009 Brazilian television series debuts
Brazilian reality television series
Portuguese-language television shows
Television shows filmed in São Paulo (state)
RecordTV original programming
Television shows set on farms